Bella Calamidades (Beautiful But Unlucky) is a Spanish-language romantic thriller telenovela produced by RTI Producciones for Caracol Television and Telemundo.It is a tongue-in-cheek romance story, it features a woman plagued by bad luck.

The filming started in late 2009 and ended in 2010, but it was until September 16, 2013 when the serial debuted on Telemundo. Telemundo aired 2 hours of the serial weekdays at 12pm/11c central, replacing 5 Viudas Sueltas. The series ended on January 3, 2014 with Avenida Brasil replacing it. The series stars Danna García and Segundo Cernadas.

Plot
The story involves a beautiful, passionate woman named Lola, who is an outcast in a town dominated by superstition. Convinced that she brings misfortune to everyone, Lola shies away from other people. When her hiding place is discovered, she returns to her home town, when a series of freakish events inevitably lead to tragedy. Heartbroken and fearing for her life at the hands of the villagers, Lola loves hope one man's love and another's generosity change her life. No one trusts her except for the man who truly loves her.

Cast
Main Cast in Order of Appearance

Production
This show was originally planned for the 2008–2009 season.The first pilot, titled "Lola Calamidades", was filmed in 2008 with Christian Meier, Danna García, Kristina Lilley and Andrea López. Meier eventually left Telemundo to pursue other things. From the pilot's cast only García, María Helena Doering, and Tiberio Cruz appear in the series. When the filming began on August 17, 2009 Telemundo had not yet cast the male lead. Martin Karpan was suggested, but due to the lack of chemistry between two leads his participation was reconsidered. At the end was the Argentinian actor Segundo Cernadas ("Muñeca Brava" leading man) got the role.

Also, Elizabeth Gutiérrez was to play at first Priscila, but refused the role in favour of other production. The role was eventually taken by Adriana Campos.

United States broadcast 
 Release dates, episode name & length, and U.S. viewers based on Telemundo's broadcast.

References

External links

Telemundo Now, Telemundo Full Episodes

2009 telenovelas
2010 telenovelas
2013 telenovelas
2009 Colombian television series debuts
2010 Colombian television series endings
2009 American television series debuts
2014 American television series endings
2013 American television series debuts
Colombian telenovelas
RTI Producciones telenovelas
Telemundo telenovelas
Caracol Televisión telenovelas
Television series by Universal Television
Spanish-language American telenovelas
American television series based on Colombian television series
Television shows set in Bogotá